Srividya (24 July 1953 – 19 October 2006), also known as Sreevidya, was an Indian actress best known for her work predominantly in Malayalam and Tamil films, along with few Telugu, Kannada and Hindi films. In a career spanning for 40 years, she had acted in more than 800 films. In the latter part of her career, she concentrated on Malayalam films. In addition to acting, Srividya occasionally worked as a playback singer as well as carnatic singer. She was also a well trained Bharathanatyam dancer. She was best known for restraint and subtlety in portrayal of varied emotions. She used her own voice for dubbing almost in all movies in all languages. In 2006, she died of Spine cancer, aged 53.

Early life 
Srividya was born on 24 July 1953 in Madras, Tamil Nadu into a Tamil family. Tamil film comedian Krishnamurthy and Carnatic classical singer M. L. Vasanthakumari were her parents. She had a brother, Sankararaman. Her father had to stop acting in the year when she was born because of a disease which affected his facial muscles. Her family fell into financial crisis. Her mother worked long hours to meet the family's financial needs. Srividya once reportedly said that her mother didn't even have time to breastfeed her. Srividya debuted in acting at a very early age. When her parents faced problems due to financial difficulties, Srividya's youth was blighted. She got a marriage proposal from a scientist based in the U.S., but the marriage did not materialize due to financial problems faced by her family.

Acting career 
Srividya started her career as a child artist in the 1967 Tamil film Thiruvarutchelvar alongside legendary actor Sivaji Ganesan. Later she entered Malayalam films with a dance scene in Kumara Sambhavam (1969), directed by P. Subramaniam and in Telugu film Tata Manavadu (1972) directed by Dasari Narayana Rao. However, her first major role was that of a college student falling in love with her professor in the 1971 Tamil film Nootrukku Nooru, directed by K. Balachander. Her first film as heroine was Delhi to Madras (1972) in which she was paired opposite Jaishankar. In the mid-1970s, she became busy in the Tamil film industry. She acted in films such as Velli Vizha, Sollathaan Ninaikkiren and Apoorva Raagangal, all directed by K. Balachander. She was Rajinikanth's first heroine in Apoorva Raagangal (1975).

She started acting in Malayalam in 1969. Her first movie was Chattambikkavala directed by N. Sankaran Nair, in which she acted as the heroine opposite to Sathyan. She gained public attention in Chenda (1973), directed by A. Vincent. Among the south Indian language movies she acted in, the maximum number of movies was in Malayalam (1969 to 2003).

Her role as Amba mythological character from the mythological story (adapted film) from the Mahabarath, Amba Ambika Ambalika (1976), has been appreciated.

Playback singing 
Srividya was a playback singer as well. She first sang for films in the Tamil film Amaran and then for Malayalam film Ayalathe Sundari. She later sang in several films, such as Oru Painkilikkadha, Njangalude Kochu Doctor, Rathilayam and Nakshathratharattu.

She was an expert classical vocalist as well. She used to sing in functions such as the Soorya Festival. She was mainly trained by her mother, who was one among the female trinity in Carnatic music, along with M. S. Subbulakshmi and D. K. Pattammal.

Personal life 

Srividya has acted in many films including Annai Velankanni, Unarchigal and Apoorva Raagangal with Kamal Haasan. Srividya fell in love with Kamal Haasan, but he was courting Vani Ganapathy at that time, and was forced to abandon her love after she got to know about their marriage.
During this period she fell in love with film director Bharathan who made many films with her as the female lead. But they couldn't continue the relationship and eventually Bharathan married KPAC Lalitha.
Later she fell in love with George Thomas, an assistant director in her Malayalam film Teekkanal. She married him on 19 January 1978 despite opposition from her family. As George wished, she was baptised before the marriage. She wanted to stay as a housewife, but had to return to acting, when George forced her to, citing financial issues. She soon realised that she made a wrong decision in marrying him. Her life became miserable and the marriage ended in divorce in 1980. After her divorce she continued acting in movies (mainly Malayalam). She had to fight seek legal action against George Thomas as he had snatched all her properties, even her prizes, from her. Hence, the divorce with George Thomas was followed by a prolonged legal battle to settle financial issues between the two. The case went up to the Supreme Court of India, where she won in the final verdict.  After the case was closed, she left Chennai and settled in Thiruvananthapuram.

Death 
In 2003, she underwent a biopsy test following physical problems and was diagnosed positive for spine cancer. She underwent treatment for three years. Two  months before her death on 17 August 2006, Srividya had executed a will and entrusted K. B. Ganesh Kumar, cine actor and MLA, to register a charitable society to ‘start a music and dance school for efficient students who could not get ample opportunities due to lack of money or to give away scholarship to such students to continue their studies and to extend financial assistance to deserving ailing artistes.’

"I am bequeathing all my properties except some payments mentioned elsewhere in this bill. An appropriate body with eminent persons, registered under Charitable Societies Act should be formed and the realised value of all my assets should be transferred as a nucleus fund," she said in the will entrusting Mr. Ganesh Kumar to register the society.

She had also left five lakh rupees each to her brother's children and one lakh rupees each to her servants in the will, executed on 17 August 2006. In October 2006, she underwent chemotherapy, but cancer had already spread throughout her body, and she died at 19:45 on 19 October 2006, aged 53. She was cremated with full state honours at Brahmana Samooham crematorium in Karamana, Thiruvananthapuram.

Awards 
Kerala State Film Awards
 1979 – Best Actress – Edavazhiyile Poocha Minda Poocha, Jeevitham Oru Gaanam
 1983 – Best Actress – Rachana
 1985 - Second Best Actress - Irakal
 1986 – Second Best Actress – Ennennum Kannettante
 1992 – Best Actress – Daivathinte vikrithikal

Kerala State Television Awards
 2004 – Best Actress : Avicharithum

 Tamil Nadu State Film Awards
 1977 – Special Prize – Madhurageetham
 1992 – MGR Award

 Kerala Film Critics Association Awards
 1979 – Best Actress – Idavazhiyile Poocha Minda Poocha
 2005 – Chalachitra Prathibha Award

Filmfare Awards South
 1975: Special Award – South – Apoorva Raagangal  (Tamil)
 1979: Best Actress – Malayalam – Edavazhiyile Poocha Mindapoocha
 1980: Best Actress – Malayalam – Puzha

 Cinema Express Awards
 1991 – Best Character Actress – Thalapathi (Tamil)

 Government Honours
 1977 – Kalaimamani – from the government of Tamil Nadu for the contribution to the Tamil cinema

Filmography

TV serials

References

External links 
 
 

1953 births
2006 deaths
Tamil actresses
20th-century Indian actresses
Actresses in Tamil cinema
Actresses in Malayalam cinema
Actresses from Chennai
Deaths from cancer in India
Deaths from breast cancer
Kerala State Film Award winners
Filmfare Awards South winners
Tamil Nadu State Film Awards winners
21st-century Indian actresses
Actresses in Malayalam television
Actresses in Tamil television
Indian television actresses
Actresses in Telugu cinema
Indian film actresses
Actresses in Hindi cinema
Actresses in Kannada cinema
Kerala State Television Award winners

te:శ్రీవిద్య